The Japan Academy Prize for Outstanding Performance by an Actress in a Supporting Role is an award presented annually by the Japan Academy Prize Association.

At the 1st Japan Academy Prize ceremony held in 1978, Kaori Momoi was the first winner of this award for her role in The Yellow Handkerchief. Since its inception, the award has been given to 36 actresses. Kimiko Yo has received the most awards in this category with three awards. As of the 2019 ceremony, Kirin Kiki is the most recent winner in this category for her role as Hatsue Shibata in Shoplifters.

Winners

Multiple wins
The following individuals received two or more Best Supporting Actress awards:

References

Outstanding Performance by an Actress in a Supporting Role
Film awards for supporting actress